Bad Cats is a pinball machine released in November 1989 by Williams. It was designed by Barry Oursler and Python Anghelo.

Gameplay

The game is themed around the life of a cat and the things they tend to do that annoy people.  The object of the game is to spell out "BAD CATS" and accumulate the progressive jackpot that begins at 1 million points, among other things.

Unusual for its era, the table Bad Cats doesn't have a multi-ball.

Skill Shot
The ball is shot into the upper rollovers. One is selected at random, and will be flashing. If the ball goes through the flashing lane, the game will award the player BONUS 2X + 120,000 points + lighting the barbecue light. The lane-change feature doesn't change the roll-over that is flashing.

Barbecue
The barbecue, when lit, causes the point value of the jet bumpers to go up from 500 points each to 5,000 points each, accompanied by cat meows and the occasional dog bark for each hit.  If the player does not light the barbecue via the Skill Shot, they can light it by completing a drop-target bank.

Inlanes
The left inlane, when lit, lights the Doghouse scoop.  The right inlane, when lit, lights the 10X Fish Bone-Us.  One lane is always lit; when collected, the light moves to the other lane.  The lit lane can also be moved by the slingshots, the left/right rubber-switches, and sometimes  the jet bumpers.

Fishbowl Ramp
The S-E-A-F-O-O-D feature is collected from a lit Doghouse. The Doghouse is lit by passing through a lit left inlane, or by shooting the unlit Doghouse. It is lit for 20 seconds. Shooting a lit Doghouse spins the S-E-A-F-O-O-D wheel, which will award one of the following prizes, numbered 1-8:

Spots B-A-D C-A-T-S letter & 25,000 points
10,000 points
Special
50,000 points
Lites Jackpot
Spin Again & 100,000 points
Extra Ball
250,000 points 

The wheel is also spun if the player manages to collect "Curiosity Spin;" this is done when the ball drains over an outlane when it is lit.

Curiosity Spin
The "Curiosity Spin" lamps are lit at both outlanes (simultaneously) on the last ball. If the ball drains via one of the outlanes, the player gets a Curiosity Spin, which spins the S-E-A-F-O-O-D wheel. If the player wins an extra ball on the Curiosity Spin, however, the lamps are not lit on the extra ball.

Trash Can/Fish-Bone Us
The trash can is linked to the linear "fish" target.  If the fish target is not hit, the trash can is deemed "empty," and awards 10,000 points when it is hit.   Hitting the Fish target will light the fish for 25K, 50K, 75K, 100K or 500K. These are timed, and will slowly turn off, one at a time, until only the 25K lamp remains.

Tiger Ramp
The Tiger Ramp is the large ramp on the far left side of the table.  Shooting the ball up the ramp awards 50K, 100K, 200K, and then 1 million points for every ramp shot.  Consecutive shots have to be made to score these values (although the ramp is not timed, for unknown reasons); hitting a birdie target or other target resets the values.

On the last ball only, making enough consecutive shots without missing also awards 20 million points (which can only be won once; afterwards, it resets to 1 million points for every ramp shot).

Fishbowl Ramp
The fishbowl ramp is the middle ramp.  When lit, it awards 30K, 50K, 100K, and an extra ball; shots must be made consecutively to score all values, including the extra ball.  The extra ball can only be collected once from the fishbowl ramp, and completing drop targets can light the extra ball.

On the last ball only, making a fifth consecutive shot after scoring 1 million points awards a special bonus of 20 million points.  This bonus can only be collected once, however; once done, the game reverts to unlimited 1 million awards for consecutive ramp shots.

Jackpot
The jackpot is a progressive jackpot that begins at 1 million points and increases until it is won.  Although the backglass displays the progressive jackpot at up to 8 million points, the game's maximum jackpot is usually 20 million depending on factory settings.

To activate the jackpot, shoot the drop target to spell out B-A-D-C-A-T-S, or BAD CATS.  Once the whole title has been lit, shoot the middle ramp to claim the jackpot.

Bonus Multiplier
Complete the rollovers at the top of the table to spell "TOY" and advance the bonus multiplier up to 7X.  The bonus itself, however, never goes above 999,000 points.

Cast of Characters
 Special
 Skill Shot
 Inlanes
 Barbeque
 Bad Cats Letter
 50 Thousand
 10 Thousand
 Lites Jackpot
 Spin Again
 Extra Ball
 250 Thousand
 Seafood Wheel
 Trash Can/Fish Bone-Us
 Jackpot
 Fishbowl Ramp
 Curiosity Spin
 Bonus Multiplier

Self-Criticism

Anghelo said that he hated working on this game. "Bad Cats was a joke. Bad Cats, and Bugs Bunny Birthday Ball, are one of my 'yes boy, kiss-ass'... and they're one of my worst experiences."

References

External links
 

Williams pinball machines
1989 pinball machines